Bellingham Technical College (Bellingham Tech or BTC) is a public technical college in Bellingham, Washington.  Although it awards some bachelor's degrees, it primarily awards associate degrees.

Campus events

LinuxFest Northwest is a weekend event held annually in late April or early May.  It is dedicated to discussion and development of the Linux operating system and other open source and free software projects.  The event is free to the public and draws more than a thousand computer professionals and enthusiasts from across Washington, Oregon, and British Columbia.

References

Universities and colleges in Bellingham, Washington
Technological universities in the United States
Community colleges in Washington (state)
Universities and colleges accredited by the Northwest Commission on Colleges and Universities